Jack Martin Blades (born April 24, 1954) is an American rock musician. He has worked in the bands Rubicon, Night Ranger (as bassist and one of the lead vocalists), and Damn Yankees (as one of the founding members). He has also recorded with Tommy Shaw under the name Shaw Blades, and has done work alongside the Tak Matsumoto Group. Blades' most recent efforts include a second solo CD.  He is also a member of the band Revolution Saints.

Personal life 
Born in Palm Desert, California, Blades started playing guitar at eight years old when his parents gave him a plastic ukulele. He attended Arcadia High School (1968/69) in Scottsdale, Arizona, then graduated from Indio High School in 1972 where he was the senior class president. While attending College of the Desert in Palm Desert he met and jammed with Pat Rizzo (who was then the sax player for Sly and the Family Stone) who introduced him to Jerry Martini (the original Sax player for Sly). Blades went off to college at San Diego State University as a pre-med student, but took a leave of absence in 1975 to move to San Francisco. Martini and Blades (joined by Brad Gillis) started the band Rubicon.

One of Blades' sons, Colin, has co-written and performed songs with his father and has also released his own solo material. Blades also has another son, James.

Career 
Blades has released two solo albums and has written or co-written songs for Aerosmith, Cher, Ozzy Osbourne, Alice Cooper, Roger Daltrey, and other artists. Blades has also produced or co-produced CDs for Night Ranger, Shaw Blades and for several other artists including Great White, Ted Nugent, and Samantha 7, among others.
Blades appears on Mötley Crüe's Dr. Feelgood album, which was released in 1989.
In the 1990s, Blades co-wrote four Aerosmith songs with Steven Tyler, Joe Perry, and Tommy Shaw: "Shut Up and Dance" (1993), "Can't Stop Messin'" (1993), "Walk on Water" (1994), "What Kind of Love Are You On" (1998).
In 1998, Blades was asked by Ringo Starr to play bass in Starr's VH1 Storytellers with Joe Walsh and Simon Kirke.

Rubicon 
Former Sly and the Family Stone saxophonist Jerry Martini formed the funk band Rubicon with Blades as bass player and fellow future Night Ranger member Brad Gillis on guitar. Rubicon recorded two albums on 20th Century Fox Records – Rubicon, and American Dreams. They had one hit single titled "I'm Gonna Take Care of Everything".  Rubicon played Cal Jam 2, held at the Ontario Motor Speedway in California before 250,000 people. Rubicon broke up in 1979 and Blades formed the short-lived club band Stereo with Brad Gillis and drummer Kelly Keagy, the latter of whom had joined as touring drummer for Rubicon.

Night Ranger 
Blades' roommate at the beginning of the '80s was Alan "Fitz" Fitzgerald, bass player for Montrose and Gamma and keyboard player for Sammy Hagar. He suggested they form a band. Fitz knew another guitar player in Sacramento (Jeff Watson) along with guitarist Brad Gillis and drummer / vocalist Kelly Keagy and Ranger was formed in 1980. The band recorded demos and played shows around the Bay area for two years. They were signed to Boardwalk Records and released their first album, Dawn Patrol in 1982. Prior to the release it was discovered that there was a country band by the name of The Rangers. Blades had written the song "Night Ranger" for the album so the band changed their name to Night Ranger to avoid any potential problems. Night Ranger went on through the '80s releasing albums which sold by the millions, as well as several hit singles. The band toured constantly both in the US and in Japan where they continue to be popular today.
In 1989, Blades left Night Ranger and formed the Damn Yankees.
Blades re-formed Night Ranger with the original members in 1996. They recorded three CDs – Neverland in 1997, Seven in 1998, and Hole in the Sun in 2008. Night Ranger continues to tour today.

Damn Yankees 
Damn Yankees was formed by Blades at the start of the 1990s along with Ted Nugent and Styx guitarist Tommy Shaw. Damn Yankees had multi platinum success with two albums Damn Yankees, Don't Tread, and a gold-selling single "High Enough". Damn Yankees recorded and toured non-stop for four years. In 1996, bandmate Ted Nugent left the band to revive his solo career. Blades and bandmate Tommy Shaw continued to produce music as Shaw Blades. Although Damn Yankees has not released any new music since 1992 and has made sporadic appearances through the 2000s onstage, the band is considered to be on hiatus but "has met multiple times to meet and write over the years."

Shaw/Blades 
After the Damn Yankees decided to take a break in 1994, Blades and Tommy Shaw decided to record together under the name Shaw/Blades. They wrote and recorded the first Shaw/Blades CD together; Hallucination was released in 1995. In 2007, Shaw/Blades released Influence (VH1 Classic Records) which is a collection of cover songs that influenced them. Shaw/Blades have toured acoustically across the US.

TMG (Tak Matsumoto Group) 
In 2004, Blades recorded a CD and toured Japan with TMG (Tak Matsumoto Group) formed by guitarist Tak Matsumoto of the Japanese mega group B'z. TMG scored a top 10 single ("Oh Japan ~Our Time Is Now~") and a No. 1 album (TMG I) on Oricon's domestic chart. With TMG, Blades performed "Never Good-Bye", the ending credits theme for the 2004 film Ultraman (a.k.a. Ultraman: The Next). The song appears on the 2005 soundtrack album for the movie and on TMG I, the 2004 album by Tak Matsumoto Group.

Solo 
Blades released his first solo album in 2004 – Jack Blades. His second solo effort, Rock n' Roll Ride, followed early in 2012.

Recent times 
Blades continues record new material with Night Ranger as they also still tour around the world. He also played at the Republican National Convention on August 29, 2012.  Member of the band Revolution Saints.

Discography

Solo albums 
Jack Blades (2004)
Rock 'n Roll Ride (2012)

with Rubicon 
Rubicon (1978)
America Dreams (1979)

with Night Ranger 
Dawn Patrol (1982)
Midnight Madness (1983)
7 Wishes (1985)
Big Life (1987)
Man in Motion (1988)
Neverland (1997)
Seven (1998)
Hole in the Sun (2007)
Somewhere in California (2011)
High Road (2014)
Don't Let Up (2017)
 ATBPO (2021)

with Damn Yankees 
Damn Yankees (1990)
Don't Tread (1992)

with Shaw Blades 
Hallucination (1995)
Influence (2007)

with Journey 

Arrival (2000) Songwriter only

with Tak Matsumoto Group 
TMG I (2004)

with Revolution Saints 
Revolution Saints (2015)
Light in the Dark (2017)
Rise (2020)

Guest appearances 
California Jam II
A Classic Rock Christmas
Bat Head Soup: A Tribute to Ozzy
Teachers
Sixteen Candles
Out of Bounds
The Secret of My Success
Nowhere to Run
Nothing But Trouble
Tommy Boy
Ultraman

References

External links 
Official website of Night Ranger

American rock bass guitarists
Night Ranger members
Damn Yankees (band) members
Living people
1954 births
American male bass guitarists
20th-century American bass guitarists
Ted Nugent Band members
20th-century American male musicians
Tak Matsumoto Group members
Frontiers Records artists
Rubicon (American band) members
Revolution Saints members